Princess Caroline-Mathilde of Denmark (Caroline-Mathilde Louise Dagmar Christine Maud Augusta Ingeborg Thyra Adelheid; 27 April 1912 – 12 December 1995) was a daughter of Prince Harald of Denmark and granddaughter of King Frederick VIII of Denmark. As the wife of Knud, Hereditary Prince of Denmark, she became Hereditary Princess of Denmark.

Early life
 Princess Caroline-Mathilde was born on 27 April 1912 at Jægersborghus country house in Gentofte north of Copenhagen, Denmark. She was the second child and daughter of Prince Harald of Denmark, son of King Frederick VIII of Denmark and Princess Louise of Sweden. Her mother was Princess Helena of Schleswig-Holstein-Sonderburg-Glücksburg, daughter of Friedrich Ferdinand, Duke of Schleswig-Holstein-Sonderburg-Glücksburg and Princess Karoline Mathilde of Schleswig-Holstein-Sonderburg-Augustenburg.

The princess was named for her maternal grandmother, and was known as 'Calma' to her family.

Marriage and children
Caroline-Mathilde married her first cousin Prince Knud of Denmark, second son and youngest child of Christian X of Denmark and Alexandrine of Mecklenburg-Schwerin on 8 September 1933 at Fredensborg Palace, Zealand, Denmark. The couple were given Sorgenfri Palace in Kongens Lyngby north of Copenhagen as their residence. The couple had three children:

 Princess Elisabeth Caroline-Mathilde Alexandrine Helena Olga Thyra Feodora Estrid Margrethe Désirée of Denmark (8 May 1935 – 19 June 2018). 
 Prince Ingolf Christian Frederik Knud Harald Gorm Gustav Viggo Valdemar Aage of Denmark (born 17 February 1940). Married Inge Terney without consent and lost his royal title, thereby becoming His Excellency Count Ingolf of Rosenborg.
 Prince Christian Frederik Franz Knud Harald Carl Oluf Gustav Georg Erik of Denmark (22 October 1942 – 21 May 2013). Married Anne Dorte Maltoft-Nielsen without consent and lost his royal title, thereby becoming His Excellency Count Christian of Rosenborg.

Later life

From 1947 to 1953, Prince Knud was heir presumptive of his older brother King Frederick IX. Knud would have become king and Caroline Mathilde queen in their turn, but a change in the constitution in 1953 caused Knud to lose his place in the succession to his niece, Margrethe II. After the change, Prince Knud was given the title of Hereditary Prince and Caroline Mathilde became Hereditary Princess.

Hereditary Prince Knud died on 14 June 1976. Hereditary Princess Caroline Mathilde survived her husband by 19 years and died on 12 December 1995 at Sorgenfri Palace. She was buried at Roskilde Cathedral next to her husband.

Honours
The Princess Caroline-Mathilde Alps in Greenland were named in her honour by the 1938–39 Mørkefjord Expedition, as her husband, Prince Knud, had been the patron of the expedition.

 :
 Knight Grand Cross with Collar of the Order of the Elephant
 Dame of the Royal Family Decoration of King Christian X, 2nd Class
 Dame of the Royal Family Decoration of King Frederick IX, 2nd Class
 Dame of the Royal Family Decoration of Queen Margrethe II, 2nd Class
 Recipient of the Red Cross Medal of Honour
 Recipient of the Red Cross Medal of Merit
 Recipient of the 100th Anniversary Medal of the Birth of King Frederick VIII
 Recipient of the 100th Anniversary Medal of the Birth of King Christian X
 Recipient of the 50th Birthday Medal of Queen Margrethe II
 Recipient of the Silver Anniversary Medal of Queen Margrethe II and Prince Henrik

References

Citations

Bibliography 

 
 

1912 births
1995 deaths
House of Glücksburg (Denmark)
Danish princesses
20th-century Lutherans
Danish Lutherans
People from Gentofte Municipality
Burials at Roskilde Cathedral